The list of shipwrecks in 2000 includes ships sunk, foundered, grounded, or otherwise lost during 2000.

January

4 January

11 January

29 January

February

11 February

March

8 March

23 March

24 March

28 March

30 March

31 March

Unknown date

April

20 April

30 April

May

23 May

June

6 June

14 June

15 June

16 June

17 June

20 June

22 June

23 June

29 June

July

13 July

17 July

21 July

22 July

August

5 August

12 August

16 August

19 August

21 August

25 August

28 August

29 August

September

10 September

12 September

26 September

October

3 October

18 October

20 October

21 October

31 October

November

20 November

29 November

December

9 December

13 December

17 December

18 December

23 December

25 December

Unknown date

Unknown date

References

2000
 
Ship